Francesca Braggiotti (October 17, 1902 – February 25, 1998) was an Italian dancer, actress, dubber, and first lady of Connecticut.

Biography 

Francesca Braggiotti was born in Florence, her father was an Italian tenor, born in Smyrna; her mother was an American mezzo-soprano from Boston. Both her parents were converted to Buddhism, among the earliest Westerners to do so; she was the second of eight brothers and sisters, all destined for success in the arts.

She began her career as a dancer, forming the Braggiotti Sisters, a duo with her sister Berthe. The duo was an overwhelming success in Boston after World War I.  Writer Alden Hatch wrote: "Two polyglot strikingly attractive and talented sisters, call Berthe and Francesca Braggiotti, were the biggest event of the Bostonian Society since Jack Gardner smoked a cigarette in public and built Fenway Court ". 
  
Francesca and her sister Berthe opened a dance studio above the barracks of the Brookline Fire Department. For a public performance sponsored by the exclusive Vincent Club, the Mayor was asked about the limits of public decency, as he had authorized their costumes for some artistic purposes, although too small to be admitted to a public beach.

The poet Amy Lowell was so enchanted that she composed an ode in honor of Francesca. Isabella Stewart Gardner asked them to a private performance at Fenway Court. The dance school of Braggiotti Sisters, as well as being the most expensive and requested, first introduced dance Expressionist movement in Boston and a new vision of health and beauty.

After the untimely death of her elder sister in 1928 Braggiotti went to work in cinema and began dubbing in Italy. She starred in Rasputin and the Empress (1932), Little Women (1933), Scipio Africanus: The Defeat of Hannibal (1937), and Tonight at Eleven (1938).

She was the first Italian voice of Greta Garbo and talk the first bar dubbed in Italian film history: "Give me a cigarette!" in the movie Mata Hari by George Fitzmaurice. She also dubbed the Swedish actress in Inspiration (Yvonne), Susan Lenox (Her Fall and Rise), Grand Hotel (Grusinskaya), As You Desire Me (Zadar / Countess Maria Varelli).

Braggiotti married John Davis Lodge in 1929, and worked with him on the set of Tonight at Eleven.  After her husband's entry into politics, she withdrew from artistic life; he was a Republican politician, U.S. Representative from 1947 to 1951, governor of Connecticut from 1951 to 1955 and diplomatic ambassador to Spain, Argentina and Switzerland. She had two children, one of whom is Lily Lodge.

References

Filmography
Rasputin and the Empress, (1932)
Little Women, directed by George Cukor (1933)
Scipio Africanus: The Defeat of Hannibal, directed by Carmine Gallone (1937)
 Tonight at Eleven, directed by Oreste Biancoli (1937)

Bibliography

 Gloria Braggiotti, Born in a crowd, Crowell, New York City, 1957.
 Salvatore John LaGumina, The Italian American experience: an encyclopedia, Garland Pub.2000, page 169.
 Jody Marie Weber, The Evolution of Aesthetic and Expressive Dance in Boston, Cambria Press, 2009.

1902 births
1998 deaths
Burials at Arlington National Cemetery
Italian female dancers
Italian film actresses
Italian voice actresses
Italian emigrants to the United States
First Ladies and Gentlemen of Connecticut
Dancers from Massachusetts
Italian Buddhists
Italian people of American descent
Actors from Florence
American people of Italian descent